Eduard Kučera (born 11 January 1953) is a Czech software engineer and an entrepreneur. He is the co-founder of the computer security company Avast along with Pavel Baudiš. Kučera is the 10th wealthiest person in the Czech Republic as of 2022 according to Forbes, with a net worth of more than 32.4 billion Czech koruna.

Kučera studied  in Charles University before co-founding Alwil Software with Baudiš. The company was renamed to Avast Software and Avast Antivirus became one of the most used computer security software applications.

References

1953 births
Living people
Charles University alumni
Czech company founders
Czech business executives
Czech billionaires
Czech software engineers